University Hospital Southampton NHS Foundation Trust is an NHS foundation trust which operates the Southampton General Hospital, the Princess Anne Hospital, Southampton Children’s Hospital, and the New Forest Birth Centre at Ashurst, Hampshire. It also provides a few services at the Royal South Hants Hospital and previously operated Countess Mountbatten House, a palliative care service at Moorgreen Hospital, which has since been renamed Mountbatten Hampshire.

In 2016 the trust established a subsidiary company, UHS Estates Limited. The intention was to achieve VAT benefits, as well as pay bill savings, by recruiting new staff on less expensive non-NHS contracts. VAT benefits arise because NHS trusts can only claim VAT back on a small subset of goods and services they buy. The Value Added Tax Act 1994 provides a mechanism through which NHS trusts can qualify for refunds on contracted out services.

Developments
The trust has one of the 11 Genomics Medicines Centres associated with Genomics England which opened across England in February 2014. All the data produced in the 100,000 Genomes project will be made available to drugs companies and researchers to help them create precision drugs for future generations.

Demand for medical imaging has been increasing by between 10% and 15% a year cumulatively since 2005. They now have 3 Siemens MRI scanners.

It is one of the biggest provider of specialised services in England, which generated an income of £262.2 million in 2014/5.

In September 2016, the trust was selected by NHS England as one of twelve Global Digital Exemplars.

Performance

It was named by the Health Service Journal as one of the top hundred NHS trusts to work for in 2015.  At that time it had 8280 full-time equivalent staff and a sickness absence rate of 3.45%. 77% of staff recommend it as a place for treatment and 68% recommended it as a place to work.

In October 2018 it was reported that more than 7,000 ophthalmology patients had not been given appropriate follow up appointments. The trust said there had been a 5% rise in patients every year and demand had outstripped capacity in most NHS trusts.

In December 2022, the hospital declared a critical incident due to extreme pressure on its service.

References

External links 
 
 University Hospital Southampton NHS Foundation Trust on the NHS website
 Inspection reports from the Care Quality Commission

Southampton
NHS foundation trusts
Health in Hampshire